Chunchen is a Chinese given name.

People called "Chunchen" include:

 Chen Chunchen (born 1975), a Taiwanese professional pool player
 Wang Chunchen (born 1964), a Chinese art historian, curator, and critic

Chinese given names